Leroy is a town in the province of Saskatchewan, Canada.

From 1905 to 1913 the area, now known as LeRoy, was a Local Improvement District. In 1913 the Local Improvement District was constituted as the Rural Municipality of Roach #339, as meetings were held at the home of James Roach. In 1914, it became the RM of Ayr #339, containing the Bogend Post Office, established in 1905, and Bogend School in 1907.
In August 1919 a Canadian Pacific Railway (CPR) blueprint showed the crossing of the proposed rail line to be built through the RM, so planning began for a town in that RM in the same year. The area was named Bogend and on January 21, 1920 it was renamed LeRoy. LeRoy was incorporated as a village on December 5, 1922. In March 1963 proclamation received declaring LeRoy a town.

Sports and recreation 
The LeRoy Memorial Arena is home to the Leroy Braves of the Long Lake Hockey League. Leroy also has a curling rink, ball diamonds nearby, and golf at the reginal park, amongst other activities. Four miles south of town is Jansen Lake and to the east are the Quill Lakes.

Leroy Leisureland Regional Park 
Leroy Leisureland Regional Park was founded in 1972 and is located four miles west of Leroy. It is nestled among 70 acres of well treed rolling land with Lanigan Creek running through it, a man-made sand swimming pool with a slide, a playground, beach volleyball, one horse shoe pit, and table tennis. There is a nine-hole grass green golf course and 34 campsites with 30-amp power. The golf clubhouse and concession were built in 1992, and, in 1999, there was a grass green upgrade to the golf course.

Demographics 

Climate

See also
List of communities in Saskatchewan
List of towns in Saskatchewan

References

External links

Towns in Saskatchewan
Division No. 10, Saskatchewan
Leroy No. 339, Saskatchewan